MTV Classic may refer to:

MTV Classic (American TV channel), a television channel that replaced VH1 Classic on August 1, 2016
MTV Classic (Australian TV channel), a television channel previously named MuchMusic until March 2004 and VH1 Australia until May 2010
MTV Classic (British and Irish TV channel), a television channel that replaced VH1 Classic in March 2010
MTV Classic (Italian TV channel), a defunct television channel previously named MTV Gold until January 2011 and shut down in 2015.
MTV Classic (Polish TV channel), a defunct television channel replaced by VH1 Polska in December 2005